Glenn Joseph (born 6 December 1952) is a former Australian rules footballer who played with North Melbourne in the Victorian Football League (VFL).

Notes

External links 

Living people
1952 births
Australian rules footballers from Victoria (Australia)
North Melbourne Football Club players
Jacana Football Club players